Bonaroo was an American pop rock band which ran 1974-1975 featuring Bobby Winkelman, guitar, vocal and songwriter; Bill Cuomo, keyboards, vocal; Michael Hossack, drums; Robert Lichtig, bass, vocal; and Jerry Weems, guitar, vocal. They took part in the Warner Brothers band tour and issued four singles and one album Bonaroo (Warner Brothers Wounded Bird Records) 1975. Winkelman went on to record Bonaroo II as a solo project.

References

American pop rock music groups
1974 establishments in the United States
Musical groups established in 1974
Musical groups disestablished in 1975
Musical quintets
Warner Records artists